Nantymoel railway station served the village of Nant-y-moel, in the historical county of Glamorgan, Wales, from 1873 to 1958 on the Ogmore Valley Railway.

History 
The station was opened on 12 May 1873 by the Llynvi and Ogmore Railway. It was known as Nant-y-moel in the timetables from 1877 to the 1890s. It closed on 5 May 1958. The site is now a cycle path, part of route 883 of the National Cycle Network.

References

External links 

Disused railway stations in Bridgend County Borough
Railway stations in Great Britain opened in 1873
Railway stations in Great Britain closed in 1958
1873 establishments in Wales
1958 disestablishments in Wales